"Crazy Handful of Nothin" is the sixth episode of the first season of the American television drama series Breaking Bad. Written by George Mastras and directed by Bronwen Hughes, it aired on AMC in the United States and Canada on March 2, 2008. The episode introduces Tuco Salamanca and No Doze, played by Raymond Cruz and Cesar Garcia respectively.

Plot 
Walter White and Jesse Pinkman come to an agreement: Walt will be the cook and silent partner in their meth operation, while Jesse will sell their product on the street. Walt also demands no further bloodshed. Meanwhile, as Walt's chemotherapy continues, he tells Skyler White that Elliott Schwartz's check came and he deposited it, when in fact he is struggling to pay for the treatment and plans on using his meth profits to cover it. At a family therapy session, Skyler tells Walt that she is concerned about his missing hours, but he says that he just likes to be alone sometimes and take walks.

While cooking meth, Jesse observes a radiotherapy burn on Walt's chest and realizes he is trying to take care of his family before he dies of lung cancer. Jesse finishes their current batch and spends all night selling it, bringing Walt his share of $1,300, far less than he expected. Jesse explains they need a distributor; after Krazy-8's death, drug lord Tuco Salamanca has taken over his territory. Jesse gains a meeting with Tuco after getting his friend Skinny Pete, who served time in prison alongside Tuco, to vouch for him. Though Tuco is willing to pay $35,000 for a pound of meth, he insists on paying only after his dealers have completed the sales. When Jesse refuses and attempts to take back the drugs, Tuco severely beats him.

Meanwhile, Hank Schrader traces the gas mask found in the desert to Walt's high school. Hank and Walt take inventory of the chemistry lab to find other equipment missing, leading Hank to suspect that a student obtained a key to the lab storage room. Later, Hank arrests the school janitor, Hugo Archuleta, who would have had the keys and had a criminal record for drug possession. Walt feels guilty letting Hugo take the blame and tries to contact Jesse, only to learn about his hospitalization. He visits Jesse and learns what happened with Tuco.

Now starting to lose his hair from the chemo, Walt decides to shave his head. Afterward, he arranges for a meeting with Tuco. He introduces himself under the alias Heisenberg, and demands $50,000 from Tuco$35,000 for the meth he took from Jesse, and $15,000 for beating Jesse. Tuco laughs at Walt for bringing him more meth after his previous batch was stolen, but Walt reveals that the substance he brought is not meth by throwing a piece against the floor, causing an explosion that blows out the windows and A/C's and knocks everyone in the room off their feet. He reveals that the bag contains fulminated mercury, and threatens to smash the entire bag to the ground. Tuco agrees to the payment as well as agreeing to a purchase for the next week, offering Walter $35,000 for the next pound of meth. Walt demands instead that Tuco buys two pounds of meth a week for $70,000. An incredulous Tuco agrees. Once back in his car with the money, Walt exhibits an intense rush from what he has just done.

Production 

The episode was written by George Mastras and directed by Bronwen Hughes; it aired on AMC in the United States and Canada on March 2, 2008.

Title meaning 
The episode title is a part of a line from the 1967 film Cool Hand Luke. A "handful of nothing" means that one lacks valuable cards in one's poker hand and must bluff to win. This is also alluded to in a scene where Walter wins a family poker game by bluffing.

Critical reception 
Seth Amitin of IGN gave the episode a rating of 9.8 out of 10 commenting: "There is a certain truism about television and this is it: start an episode with an explosion and we like you. Start it off with an explosion and someone walking away with a bag full of cash and no explanation, we love you. Build up five episodes that were leading to a conclusion as drastic as this, and we'll worship the ground you walk on. This, friends, was a fantastic episode."

In 2019 The Ringer ranked "Crazy Handful of Nothin'" as the 32nd best out of the 62 total Breaking Bad episodes.

References

External links 
 "Crazy Handful of Nothin'"  at the official Breaking Bad site
 

2008 American television episodes
Breaking Bad (season 1) episodes